The Family Man is a 1979 television film, directed by Glenn Jordan and starring Ed Asner and Meredith Baxter Birney.

Plot
Asner plays a prosperous Irish-born New Yorker who falls in love with a young pianist and is tempted to be unfaithful to his wife for the first time.

Cast
Edward Asner as Eddie Madden
Meredith Baxter Birney as Mercedes Cole
Anne Jackson as Maggie Madden
Dick Latessa as Fred
Michael Kirby as Walter
Michael Wincott as Charlie
Martin Short as Louie
Gordon Thomson as Dance Instructor
Michael Ironside as Bartender

Reception
Writing in the New York Times, Tom Buckley gave the film a bad review, calling the script "resolutely undramatic, stilted and humorless", the directing "like stretching taffy" and Asner's accent "intermittent and unconvincing".

References

External links

1979 television films
1979 films
American television films
Films scored by Billy Goldenberg